Frans Josef Thomas Wackers (born 1939, Echt, Netherlands)  is a medical doctor and research scientist in the field of nuclear cardiology.

Education and positions held
M.D., Ph.D., University of Amsterdam, Netherlands (1970)
Military service, The Netherlands (1970–1972) 
Internal Medicine Residency, University of Amsterdam, The Netherlands (1972–1974) 
Cardiology Fellow, University of Amsterdam, The Netherlands (1974–1977) 
Cardiology Faculty, Yale University School of Medicine (1977–1981) 
Cardiology Faculty, University of Vermont College of Medicine (1981–1984) 
Rejoined Cardiology Faculty, Yale University School of Medicine (1984 to present)

Affiliations
Fellow of the American College of Cardiology 
Fellow of the American Heart Association, Council on Clinical Cardiology
Founding member and Fellow of the American Society of Nuclear Cardiology (President, 1994–1995)
Founding member and Fellow of the Society of Nuclear Medicine (President of Cardiovascular Council, 1992–1995)
Founding member and Fellow of the European Society of Cardiology
Founding member of the Certification Board of Nuclear Cardiology (President, 1996–1997)
Founding member of the Intersocietal Commission for Accreditation of Nuclear laboratories (1997–2005)

Wackers also co-chaired the European Society of Cardiology's 6th and 7th International Conference of Nuclear Cardiology in Florence and Lisbon.

Publications
He is/was on the Editorial Board of the Journal of the American College of Cardiology, the American Journal of Cardiology, and Journal of Nuclear Cardiology.

He has published more than 340 articles on nuclear cardiology and clinical cardiology.

Awards
Rescar Award of the University of Maastricht, The Netherlands (1988)
Herrman Blumgart Award of the Society of Nuclear Medicine, New England Chapter (1995)
Homi Baba Award of the Indian Nuclear Cardiological Society (1997)
Eugene Drake Award of the American Heart Association, New England Affiliate (1999)
Distinguished Service Award of the Society of Nuclear Cardiology (1999)
Third Mario Verani Memorial Lecturer of the American Society of Nuclear Cardiology (2004)
Wenckebach Lecturer of the Netherlands Society of Cardiology (2005).

Notes

References

F.J.T. Wackers at the University of Amsterdam Album Academicum website

1939 births
Living people
American cardiologists
Dutch cardiologists
American nuclear medicine physicians
University of Amsterdam alumni
Yale School of Medicine faculty
People from Echt-Susteren
Dutch emigrants to the United States 
Fellows of the American College of Cardiology